Lokgwabe is a village in Kgalagadi District of Botswana. It is located in the Kalahari Desert and the village has a primary school. The population was 1,417 in 2011 census.

References

Kgalagadi District
Villages in Botswana